Emperor Yi of Chu (died 206 BC), also known as King Huai II of Chu before receiving his de jure emperor title, personal name Xiong Xin, was the ruler of the revived Chu state in the late Qin dynasty. He was a grandson of King Huai of Chu. In 223 BC, during the Warring States period, the Chu state was conquered by the Qin state, which unified the various Chinese feudal states in a series of wars and established the Qin dynasty in 221 BC. In 209 BC, when rebellions broke out throughout China to overthrow the Qin dynasty, the Chu state was revived as an insurgent state against Qin imperial rule. Xiong Xin was discovered by Xiang Liang, a rebel leader who descended from a famous Chu general, and installed on the Chu throne as "King Huai II of Chu". However, Xiong Xin was merely a puppet ruler because power was concentrated in Xiang Liang's hands, and was later passed on to Xiang Liang's nephew, Xiang Yu, after Xiang Liang was killed in battle. In 206 BC, the Qin dynasty was overthrown by the rebels, after which Xiang Yu, who was the de facto leader of all the rebel forces, divided the former Qin Empire into the Eighteen Kingdoms. He promoted King Huai II to a more "honourable" title – Emperor Yi of Chu – and made him the nominal sovereign ruler over all the Eighteen Kingdoms. Xiang Yu then had Emperor Yi relocated to Chen County (郴縣; in present-day Chenzhou, Hunan) and secretly ordered Ying Bu to assassinate the emperor during the journey.

Life

Early life
Xiong Xin was a descendant of the royal family of the Chu state in the Warring States period, and a grandson of King Huai of Chu. However, he was not in the main line of succession and there were four kings who succeeded his grandfather before the Chu state was conquered by the Qin state in 223 BC. Xiong Xin lived as a commoner under Qin rule after the fall of Chu.

King of Chu
In 209 BC, the Dazexiang Uprising broke out under the leadership of Chen Sheng, who proclaimed himself "King of Zhangchu" (張楚王; lit. "king of rising Chu") and aimed to overthrow the Qin dynasty. Although Chen Sheng's uprising was crushed by Qin imperial forces, other rebellions erupted throughout China to overthrow the Qin dynasty and restore the former six states conquered by Qin about two decades ago. The leader of the Chu insurgent state, Xiang Liang, was advised by Fan Zeng to seek a member of the Chu royal family and install him on the throne to garner more support from the people. Xiang Liang found Xiong Xin, who was living as a shepherd, and installed him on the throne in the summer of 208 BC. Xiong Xin ruled under the title of "King Huai II of Chu".

King Huai II was effectively a puppet ruler because the power of Chu was concentrated in Xiang Liang's hands. However, after Xiang Liang was killed at the Battle of Dingtao in the winter of 208 BC, King Huai II seized the control of the armies of two Chu generals, Xiang Yu and Lü Chen, and gradually began to assert his authority. After that, the king ordered Song Yi and Liu Bang to lead two armies to attack Qin, and promised to award the title "King of Guanzhong" to whoever entered Guanzhong (the Qin heartland) first. Xiang Liang's nephew, Xiang Yu, was the second-in-command to Song Yi, who led his army to attack Qin forces led by Zhang Han. Zhang Han's army was besieging Handan, the capital of the Zhao state, and Song Yi refused to advance any further to assist the Zhao forces. Xiang Yu took Song Yi by surprise in a meeting, falsely accused him of treason, killed him and usurped his command. He then sent a messenger to inform King Huai II, who reluctantly approved his command. In the winter of 207 BC, Liu Bang arrived in Guanzhong first, before Xiang Yu. The last Qin ruler, Ziying, surrendered to Liu Bang and brought an end to the Qin dynasty.

Emperor of Chu
According to the promise made earlier by King Huai II, Liu Bang should rightfully have become the "King of Guanzhong", but after Xiang Yu reached Guanzhong, he wrote a letter to King Huai II to ask the king to give him the title instead. King Huai II's reply was to the effect of "per my earlier promise", but Xiang Yu ignored him and took control of Guanzhong from Liu Bang since he was more militarily powerful than Liu Bang. Xiang Yu then proclaimed himself "Hegemon-King of Western Chu" and divided the former Qin Empire into the Eighteen Kingdoms, each ruled by one of the leaders of the rebel forces which overthrew the Qin dynasty. He also promoted King Huai II to a seemingly more "honourable" title – Emperor Yi of Chu. However, later, he had the puppet emperor relocated to Chen County (郴縣; in present-day Chenzhou, Hunan), thereby effectively sending the emperor into exile.

Death
Emperor Yi was aware that Xiang Yu wanted to force him into exile, so he feigned illness and used that as an excuse to postpone his trip to Chen County, but to no avail. Xiang Yu still forced him to make his way from Pengcheng (彭城; present-day Xuzhou, Jiangsu) to Chen County. At the same time, he secretly ordered Ying Bu, Wu Rui and Gong Ao to kill the emperor during the journey to Chen County. Emperor Yi was murdered by Ying Bu's men near Chen County and buried by the locals at a hill in the southwest of the county.

Between 206–202 BC, a power struggle for supremacy over China (historically known as the Chu–Han Contention) broke out between Xiang Yu and Liu Bang. Liu Bang used Emperor Yi's death as political propaganda to justify his war against Xiang Yu. In 205 BC, he held a three-day memorial service for the emperor, accused Xiang Yu of committing regicide, and rallied support from the people against Xiang Yu. In 202 BC, the Chu–Han Contention concluded with victory for Liu Bang, who became the sovereign ruler of China and established the Han dynasty. Liu Bang ordered his generals Zhou Bo, Wang Ling and Fan Kuai, who had been enfeoffed as marquises, to conduct memorial services for Emperor Yi in their respective marquisates.

Legacy
Yi sometimes appears as a door god in Chinese and Taoist temples, usually paired with the last Qin ruler Ziying.

Notes

See also
 Timeline of the Chu–Han Contention

References

Citations

Bibliography
 Sima Qian. Records of the Grand Historian, volumes 7, 8.
 Sima Guang. Zizhi Tongjian, volumes 8, 9.

206 BC deaths
Chinese emperors
Murdered Chinese emperors
Chu–Han contention people
Year of birth unknown
Chinese gods
Deified Chinese people
Founding monarchs